This article contains information about the literary events and publications of 1773.

Events
January – Christoph Martin Wieland begins publishing the influential literary monthly Der Teutsche Merkur in Weimar.
March 15 – Oliver Goldsmith's comedy She Stoops to Conquer is performed for the first time, at the Covent Garden Theatre in London.
April 13 – Richard Brinsley Sheridan marries singer and actress Elizabeth Ann Linley.
May 1 – Richard Wroughton takes the role of Prince Henry in Henry II, King of England by John Bancroft at Covent Garden.
May 4 – Eibhlín Dubh Ní Chonaill composes the keen Caoineadh Airt Uí Laoghaire over the body of her husband Art Ó Laoghaire.
August 6 – Samuel Johnson sets out for Scotland, where on August 14 he meets James Boswell in Edinburgh for their tour to the Hebrides.
September 1 – Poems on Various Subjects, Religious and Moral by Phillis Wheatley (described as "Negro Servant to Mr. John Wheatley, of Boston, in New England"), the first work of an African American female writer to be published in English, including "On Being Brought from Africa to America", is published in Aldgate, London by Archibald Bell, bookseller, because publishers in Boston, Massachusetts, had declined to publish it and Wheatley and her master's son, Nathanial Wheatley, had come to London where Selina, Countess of Huntingdon and the Earl of Dartmouth helped with the publication.
unknown dates
Cláudio Manuel da Costa writes his epic poem Vila Rica, relating the history of the homonymous Brazilian city, modern-day Ouro Preto; it is not published until 1839.
The last five cantos of Friedrich Gottlieb Klopstock's epic poem Der Messias are published in Hamburg.
Compilation of the Siku Quanshu ("Complete Library of the Four Treasuries") begins in Qing Dynasty China. The Wenjin Chamber is built at the Chengde Mountain Resort to accommodate a copy.

New books

Fiction
Elizabeth Bonhote – The Fashionable Friend
Calixto Bustamante Carlos (Concolorcorvo) – Lazarillo de ciegos caminantes
José Cadalso – Cartas marruecas (Moroccan letters)
Mrs Fogerty – The Fatal Connexion
Richard Graves – The Spiritual Quixote
Henry Mackenzie – The Man of the World
Johann Karl Wezel – Lebensgeschichte Tobias Knauts, des Weisen, sonst der Stammler genannt: aus Familiennachrichten gesammelt (Life story of Tobias Knaut the Wise, Otherwise Called the Stammerer; publication begins)

Drama
Charles Dibdin – The Deserter
Johann Wolfgang von Goethe – Götz von Berlichingen
Oliver Goldsmith – She Stoops to Conquer
Thomas Hawkins – The Origin of the English Drama
John Home – Alonzo
William Kenrick – The Duellist
Henry Mackenzie – The Prince of Tunis
Arthur Murphy – Alzuma
Mercy Otis Warren – The Adulateur
George Steevens (editor) – The Plays of William Shakespeare

Poetry

Anna Laetitia Barbauld – Poems
John Bicknell and Thomas Day – The Dying Negro
José Cadalso – Ocios de mi juventud
Robert Fergusson
Poems
Auld Reikie
Richard Graves – The Love of Order
Edward Jerningham – Faldoni and Teresa
George Keate – The Monument in Arcadia
James Macpherson – The Iliad
Hannah More – A Search After Happiness
Thomas Scott – Lyric Poems
Phillis Wheatley – Poems on Various Subjects, Religious and Moral
John Wolcot – Persian Love Elegies

Non-fiction
Anna Laetitia Barbauld and John Aikin – Miscellaneous Pieces
Patrick Brydone – A Tour Through Sicily and Malta
James Burnett, Lord Monboddo – Of the Origin and Progress of Language
Charles Burney – The Present State of Music in Germany, the Netherlands, and United Provinces
José Cadalso – Apuntaciones autobiográficas
Hester Chapone – Letters on the Improvement of the Mind
David Dalrymple, Lord Hailes – Remarks on the History of Scotland
Antoine Court de Gébelin – Le Monde primitif (publication begins)
John Hawkesworth – An Account of the Voyages for Making Discoveries in the Southern Hemisphere
Thomas Hawkins – The Origin of the English Drama
Tomás de Iriarte – Los literatos en Cuaresm`
Thomas Leland – The History of Ireland, from the invasion of Henry II
William Melmoth – Cato
Louis-Sébastien Mercier – L'Essai sur l'art dramatique
John Scott – Observations on the Present State of the Parochial and Vagrant Poor

Births
April 9 – Étienne Aignan, French translator, librettist and dramatist (died 1824 in literature)
May 19 – Jean Charles Léonard de Sismondi, Swiss scholar of literature, history and economics (died 1842)
August 21 – Jens Christian Djurhuus, Faroese poet (died 1853)
October 1 – Peter Kaiser, Liechtenstein statesman and historian (died 1864)
October 23 – Francis Jeffrey, Scottish jurist and critic (died 1850)
December 9 – Marianne Ehrenström, Swedish musician and writer (died 1867)
unknown date – Margaret Prior, American humanitarian, missionary, social reformer, memoirist (died 1842)

Deaths
January 21 – Alexis Piron, French dramatist and epigrammatist (born 1689)
April 20 – Hubert-François Gravelot, French book illustrator (born 1699)
April 25 – Daniele Farlati, ecclesiastical historian (born 1690)
May 15 – Alban Butler, hagiographer (born 1710)
July 5 – Francisco José Freire, Portuguese historian and philologist (born 1719)
August 3 – Stanisław Konarski, Polish political writer, poet and dramatist (born 1700)
August 20 – Enrique Florez, Spanish historian (born 1729)
August 28 – John Ranby, English surgeon and writer on surgery (born 1703)
September 18 – John Cunningham, Irish poet, dramatist and actor (born 1729)
November 16 – John Hawkesworth, English poet and editor (born c. 1715)

References

 
Years of the 18th century in literature